Simon Gronowski (born October 12, 1931) is a Doctor of Law, from the Free University of Brussels, a jazz pianist, and the president of the Union of Jewish deportees in Belgium.

Gronowski was born in Brussels, and survived the Holocaust by escaping deportation in Convoy No. 20 train, on 19 April 1943, which would have taken him to Auschwitz. The photo is of a board commemorating this.  He then lived through the rest of the war in hiding, with his father Léon Gronowski.

PUSH Opera

In 2014, Simon Gronowski met British composer Howard Moody at a performance of his opera Sinbad at La Monnaie Opera House in Brussels; Simon Gronowski told the composer the story of his escape and life and ended with the phrase "Ma Vie N'est Que Miracles". Moody was so moved he promised to write his next opera about Simon that night. His opera PUSH tells the story of Simon's escape from the 20th Convoy Train on April 19, 1943 and how his mother pushed Simon off the train. The opera PUSH was premiered in Bexhill, England at the De La Warr Pavillion after being commissioned by the Battle Festival. Gronowski attended the premiere. 
After an invitation from The House of Commons, PUSH was performed on January 27 to mark Holocaust Memorial Day in 2018, where  Simon Gronowski was a special guest.

References

This article incorporates information from the French Wikipedia.

External links 

1931 births
Belgian people of World War II
Jurists from Brussels
Holocaust survivors
Recipients of the Cross of the Order of Merit of the Federal Republic of Germany
Living people
Belgian Jews